Shift time refers to the time interval between gear changes in a transmission. This interval is the time in which power delivery is transferred to the next selected gear, and engine speed is reduced or increased to synchronize the speed of the next gear. Shift time is usually in reference to motor vehicles, but can apply to any gearbox.

Reducing shift time is important in performance and racing vehicles because upshifting generally interrupts power delivery to the wheels. Shift time in a manual gearbox is dependent on the driver, but in automatic or automated manual cars, the electronic or hydraulic control system must be calibrated and tuned to execute fast gear changes. Generally, a dual-clutch transmission shifts faster than a standard hydraulic automatic transmission with a torque converter or a single-clutch automated manual transmission. This is possible because the DCT can pre-select the next gear and switch between its two separate clutches to the next pre-determined gear, thus reducing shift times. Using a freewheel may reduce shift time, as it may not be necessary to use the clutch. A shift kit is also intended to reduce the shift time of a manual vehicle.

With a manual transmission, upshift time can be reduced by installing a lighter flywheel. During an upshift, the engine speed must decrease to synchronize with a higher gear; a lighter flywheel will allow the engine speed to drop more quickly, leading to shorter shift times.

Shift times
A long shift time is considered anything over 625 milliseconds.
The average manual car driver takes between 500 ms and 1 s to perform vertical gear changes (i.e. 1st-2nd, 3rd-4th, 5th-6th) and 1 - 2 s to perform horizontal gear changes (i.e. 2nd-3rd, 4th-5th). Shift time is also dependent on gear throws (distance between gears), ease of movement, ergonomics of the gear stick, and gearbox condition. 
For reference, the time it takes for a human to blink can be as quick as 100ms (.1 seconds)

Example upshift times 
Please note that manufacturers may have different definitions of shift times.

See also 
 Powershifting
 Shift kit

References 

Automobile transmissions